is a junction passenger railway station located in the town of Kaiyō, Kaifu District, Tokushima Prefecture, Japan. It is operated jointly by JR Shikoku and the third-sector Asa Seaside Railway and has the station number "M27".

Lines
Only local trains stop at the station. And, since 1 November 2020, it is the northern terminus of the 10.0 kilometer Asato Line to Kannoura Station.

Limited express Muroto (train) is extended to this station, and the service goes to Tokushima Station via Mugi Station in the morning.

Layout
The station, which is unstaffed, consists of a side platform serving a single track. There is no station building but a community interaction centre set up by the local municipal authorities is linked to the platform and serves as a waiting room. There is, additionally, a weather shelter on the platform. Access to the platform is by means of a flight of steps from the station forecourt or a ramp from the community interaction centre. A bike shed is provided near the base of the steps.

And, DMV departs from and arrives at a bus stop in front of this station.

DMV 
Since 1 November 2020, this station has been transferred to Asa Seaside Railway and managed with Asa Seaside Railway and JR Shikoku because DMV is commenced operating from 2021. What is more, discontinued interconnection with JR and Asa Seaside Railway due to construction of DMV. 

And, Asa Seaside Railway Awa-Kainan Station will be changed to a signal station, so trains depart from and arrive at bus stop near the station.

Adjacent stations

History
On 1 April 1987, with the privatization of JNR, control of the station passed to JR Shikoku. And, since 1 November 2020, the station has been transferred to Asa Seaside Railway.

Passenger statistics
In fiscal 2019, the station was used by an average of 176 passengers daily.

Surrounding area
Kaiyo Town Hall
Kaiyo Municipal Library
Kaiyo Municipal Kainan Hospital

See also
 List of Railway Stations in Japan

References

External links

 JR Shikoku timetable
Asatetsu home page

Railway stations in Tokushima Prefecture
Railway stations in Japan opened in 1973
Kaiyō, Tokushima